Paul Alfons Maria Clemens Lothar Philippus Neri Felix Nicomedes Prinz von Metternich-Winneburg (26 May 1917 – 21 September 1992) was a German-Austrian racing driver and President of the Commission Sportive Internationale (CSI), before becoming President of the Fédération Internationale de l'Automobile (FIA) in 1975.

Biography 
Prince Paul Alfons von Metternich-Winneburg zu Beilstein, known informally as Paul Metternich, was born in Vienna in the noble diplomatic family of Metternich and was a great-grandson of the Austrian statesman Klemens von Metternich. He attended the Institut Le Rosey in Switzerland.

In 1940 in Berlin, where he belonged to a circle of opponents of the Nazi regime, he met his future wife Tatiana Vassiltschikov, who had a position in the foreign office. They were married in Berlin-Grunewald on 6 September 1941 and lived initially at Kynžvart Castle (Schloss Königswart) in Egerland (now in the Czech Republic).

In 1945 he was expelled from Czechoslovakia and lost his property there. He moved to another family estate (from 1816), the winery Schloss Johannisberg in the Rheingau, which had been destroyed in the war. He later rebuilt it and ran the winery with his wife.

He also became a racing car driver. Among other contests, he participated in the Monte Carlo Rally and the 1956 24 Hours of Le Mans. From 1960 he was President of the Automobilclub von Deutschland. From 1975 until 1985 he was President of the worldwide automobile club FIA.

He was further engaged in the Order of Saint Lazarus charity organisation and was Grand bailiff for the German Balliwick.

In 1979 he was awarded the Order of Merit of the Federal Republic of Germany.

His wife Tatiana was a well known art patron. With his death in Geneva, the main line of the Metternich family became extinct. His widow was the last representative of the House of Metternich-Winneburg.

Trivia 
 The sparkling wine "Fürst von Metternich" was issued by the firm Henkell & Co. Sektkellerei.
 He was editor of the book Fürstlicher Begleiter für Feinschmecker. Restaurants in Deutschland (Ducal Companion for Gourmets. Restaurants in Germany).
 The concert hall in Schloss Johannisberg is called Fürst-von-Metternich-Saal in his memory.

Le-Mans Results

Titles and honors
 :
 Commander of the Order of Grimaldi (29 January 1972)

Literature

References

External links 

World Sportscar Championship drivers
24 Hours of Le Mans drivers
Auto racing executives
German racing drivers
German princes
House of Metternich
Commanders Crosses of the Order of Merit of the Federal Republic of Germany
Fédération Internationale de l'Automobile presidents
Formula One people
1917 births
1992 deaths
People from the Rheingau
Alumni of Institut Le Rosey